Jake Brown (born 28 March 1992) is an American biathlete. He qualified to represent the United States at the 2022 Winter Olympics.

Career results

World Championships

Rankings

References

1992 births
Living people
American male biathletes
Sportspeople from Edina, Minnesota
Biathletes at the 2022 Winter Olympics
Olympic biathletes of the United States